A jarlig (zarlig; , jarlyk, also transliterated yarlyk in Russian and Turkic, or even more correctly yarlıq,  and the Tatar: yarlığ) is an edict or written commandant of  Mongol and Chinggisid rulers' "formal diplomas". It was one of three types of non-fundamental law pronouncements that had the effect of a regulation or ordinance, the other two being debter (a record of precedence cases for administration and judicial decisions) and billing (maxims or sayings attributed to Genghis Khan). The jarliq provide important information about the running of the Mongol Empire.

Ögedei Khagan prohibited the nobility from issuing gergees (tablet that gave the bearer authority to demand goods and services from civilian populations) and jarliqs in the 1230s. 

From the mid-13th to mid-15th centuries, all princes of Northeastern Rus received jarliq authorizing their rule. The issuing of jarlyk on governing of Rus finalized the establishment of the title of Grand Duke of Vladimir
(Grand Prince). Initially, those jarliq came from the qaghan in Karakorum, but after  Batu established the khanate of the Golden Horde, they came from  Sarai. None of these jarliq, however, is extant. In the mid-fifteenth century, Grand Duke Basil II of Moscow began forbidding other Rus princes from receiving the jarliq from Mongol khans, thus establishing the right of the Moscow grand prince to authorize local princely rule. Mongol leaders gave the jarliq to emissaries, travelers, monks and merchants to give them free passage, exemptions from taxes and imposts and security.

Kublai Khan began the practice of having the four great aristocrats in his kheshig sign all jarliqs (decrees), a practice that spread to all other Mongol khanates in 1280.

Ghazan reformed the issuance of jarliqs (edicts), creating set forms and graded seals, ordering that all jarliqs be kept on file at court in Persia. Jarliqs older than 30 years were to be cancelled, along with old paizas (Mongol seals of authority).  

Even after 1260, the Yuan Dynasty in China still considered jarlig must be issued by only Qa'an/Khagan (Emperor) but linkji by khans (princes) of three western khanates. However, some high-ranking officials continued to issue jarligs under the name of a khan or Emperor in Central Asia.

The Rus' metropolitan archive preserves six jarliq (constituting the so-called Short Collection) considered to be translations into Russian of authentic patents issued from the Qipchaq Khanate:

 from Khan Tiuliak (Tulunbek) of Mamai's Horde to Metropolitan Mikhail (Mitia) (1379)
 from Khatun Taydula to the Rus' princes (1347)
 from Khan Mengu-Timur to Metropolitan Peter (1308)
 from Khatun Taydula to Metropolitan Feognost (1343)
 from Khan Berdibeg to Metropolitan Alexius (Alexei) (1357)
 from Khatun Taydula to Metropolitan Alexius (1354)

A seventh jarliq, which purports to be from Khan Özbeg to Metropolitan Peter (found in the so-called full collection) has been determined to be a sixteenth-century forgery. The jarliq to the metropolitans affirm the freedom of the Church from taxes and tributes, and declare that the Church's property should be protected from expropriation or damage as long as Rus' churchmen pray for the well-being of the khan and his family.

Contemporary use
In Russian culture the word means a label, rarely a price tag. An icon shortcut in modern graphical user interfaces is also called this way.

See also
 Firman

References

Bibliography 

Mongol Empire
Legal history of Russia
Turkic words and phrases
Medieval law
Legal history of Mongolia